Coccoloba diversifolia, known as pigeonplum or tietongue, is a species of the genus Coccoloba native to coastal areas of the Caribbean, Central America (Belize, Guatemala), southern Mexico, southern Florida (coastal regions from Cape Canaveral to the Florida Keys) and the Bahamas.

Description
Pigeonplum is a small to medium-sized tree growing to 10 m (rarely to 18 m) tall. The bark is light gray, smooth, and thin but may become scaly on the largest trees. The leaves are 3–13 cm long and 1–7 cm broad, smooth edged, wavy, oval to oblong, rounded or pointed on the ends, leathery, brighter green above and paler below; leaves on young plants and root sprouts are larger than those on mature plants.

The numerous, inconspicuous flowers appear on spikes 1.5–18 cm long in the spring. The fruit is an achene 6–10 mm long surrounded by a dark purple edible fleshy perianth, ripening in the fall. The tree is unable to survive hard frost. It is resistant to high winds, salt and drought.

References

External links
Interactive Distribution Map for Coccoloba diversifolia

diversifolia
Trees of the Southeastern United States
Trees of Mexico
Trees of Belize
Trees of Guatemala
Trees of the Caribbean